Paolo Dametto (born 28 June 1993) is an Italian footballer who plays as a defender for Torres.

Biography
Born in Arborea, Sardinia. Dametto started his career at the capital of the island region, for Cagliari. On 19 January 2012 Dametto was signed by Prato in a temporary deal. On 3 July 2012 he remained in Lega Pro, but for Lumezzane.

In summer 2013 he was signed by Parma F.C. on a free transfer in a 5-year contract. He was immediately farmed to another Emilian club Reggiana.

On 6 August 2014 Dametto was re-signed by Prato. On 20 June 2016 Parma formally bankrupted. He became a free agent.

In December 2015 Dametto returned to Sardinia for Olbia. The club promoted to Lega Pro in 2016 to fill the vacancies.

On 5 October 2018, he signed with FeralpiSalò.

On 17 July 2019, he signed with Pistoiese.

On 9 August 2021, he joined Torres in Serie D.

References

External links

 AIC profile 

1993 births
People from the Province of Oristano
Footballers from Sardinia
Living people
Italian footballers
Association football defenders
Italy youth international footballers
Cagliari Calcio players
A.C. Reggiana 1919 players
A.C. Prato players
F.C. Lumezzane V.G.Z. A.S.D. players
Olbia Calcio 1905 players
FeralpiSalò players
U.S. Pistoiese 1921 players
AZ Picerno players
S.E.F. Torres 1903 players
Serie C players
Serie D players